Lafayette Marion Henion (June 7, 1899 in Eureka, California – July 22, 1955 in San Luis Obispo, California) was a pitcher in Major League Baseball. He pitched in one game for the Brooklyn Robins during on September 10, 1919, working three innings and giving up two hits and two runs. He also struck out two and walked two.

External links

1899 births
1955 deaths
Baseball players from California
Major League Baseball pitchers
Brooklyn Robins players
Winnipeg Maroons (baseball) players
Regina Senators players
San Francisco Seals (baseball) players
Sportspeople from Eureka, California
Vancouver Beavers players
Moose Jaw Robin Hoods players
Aberdeen Black Cats players